North Carolina School for the Blind and Deaf Dormitory, also known as the Old Health Building, is a historic dormitory building located at Raleigh, North Carolina. It was designed by the architect Frank Pierce Milburn and built in 1898. It is a 3 1/2-story, rectangular, red brick, Châteauesque style building. It features a dramatic, towered dormered roofline and measures 104 feet wide and 85 feet deep. It consists of a rectangular block with parapeted gabled pavilions, three-story engaged towers, and a three-story rear wing.  It is the only remaining structure of the North Carolina School for the Blind and Deaf, now known as Governor Morehead School.  After the school moved to a new location in 1923, the building housed state offices.

It was listed on the National Register of Historic Places in 1976.

References 

Residential buildings on the National Register of Historic Places in North Carolina
Renaissance Revival architecture in North Carolina
Residential buildings completed in 1898
Buildings and structures in Raleigh, North Carolina
National Register of Historic Places in Raleigh, North Carolina
1898 establishments in North Carolina